CBC Calgary refers to:
CBR (AM) and CBR-1-FM, CBC Radio One on 1010 AM and 99.1 FM
CBR-FM, CBC Radio 2 on 102.1 FM
CBRT-DT, CBC Television on channel 9

SRC Calgary refers to:
CBRF-FM, Ici Radio-Canada Première on 103.9 FM, rebroadcasts CHFA
CBCX-FM, Ici Musique on 89.7 FM
CBRFT, Ici Radio-Canada Télé on channel 16, rebroadcasts CBXFT